Events from the year 1834 in the United States.

Incumbents

Federal Government 
 President: Andrew Jackson (D-Tennessee)
 Vice President: Martin Van Buren (D-New York)
 Chief Justice: John Marshall (Virginia)
 Speaker of the House of Representatives: Andrew Stevenson (D-Virginia) (until June 2), John Bell (Whig-Tennessee) (starting June 2)
 Congress: 23rd

Events
 January 25 – Hillsborough County is created by Florida's territorial legislature.
 March 11 – United States Survey of the Coast transferred to the Department of the Navy.
 March 28 – The United States Senate censures President Andrew Jackson for his actions in defunding the Second Bank of the United States (censure expunged in 1837).
 April 14 – The Whig Party is officially named by United States Senator Henry Clay.
 June 30 – the 6th Indian Trade and Intercourse Act is updated and renewed Indian Territory is effective.
 July 7–10 – Anti-abolitionist riots in New York City.
 July 29 – Office of Indian Affairs organized.
 August 11–12 – Ursuline Convent Riots: A convent of Ursuline nuns is burned near Boston.
 October 31 – Solon Robinson settled in the location that would eventually become Crown Point, Indiana. 
 November 4 – Delta Upsilon fraternity founded at Williams College.
 November 11 – The rare 1804 dollar coin is struck by the United States Mint.

Undated
 Worcester Academy is founded as the Worcester County Manual Labor High School.
 Franklin College is founded in Franklin, Indiana.
 The Medical College of Louisiana is founded in New Orleans, which later becomes Tulane University.
 Wake Forest College is founded in Wake Forest, which later becomes Wake Forest University.
 The Wilmington and Raleigh Railroad is chartered in Wilmington, North Carolina, and begins construction.

Births
 January 9 – Wilkinson Call, U.S. Senator from Florida from 1879 to 1897 (died 1910)
 January 15 – Samuel Arza Davenport, politician (died 1911)
 February 27 – Charles C. Carpenter, admiral (died 1899)
 March 4 – James W. McDill, U.S. Senator from Iowa from 1881 to 1883 (died 1894)
 March 5
Martha Parmelee Rose, journalist, social reformer, philanthropist (died 1923)
U. M. Rose, Arkansas lawyer (died 1913)
 March 15 – John K. Bucklyn, Medal of Honor recipient (died 1906)
 March 20 – Charles W. Eliot, President of Harvard University (died 1926)
 March 24 – John Wesley Powell, explorer (died 1902)
 April 1 – Big Jim Fisk, entrepreneur (died 1872)
 April 5 – Frank R. Stockton, short story writer (died 1902)
 April 26 – Charles Farrar Browne ("Artemus Ward"), humorist (died 1867)
 June 22 – William Chester Minor, Ceylonese-born surgeon and lexicographer (died 1920)
 June 24 – George Arnold, writer and poet (died 1865)
 June 28 – Samuel Pasco, British-born U.S. Senator from Florida from 1887 to 1899 (died 1917)
 July 10 – James Abbott McNeill Whistler, painter and etcher (died 1903 in the United Kingdom)
 July 19 – Benjamin F. Jonas, U.S. Senator from Louisiana from 1879 to 1885 (died 1911)
 August 22 – Samuel Pierpont Langley, astronomer, physicist and aeronautics pioneer (died 1906)
 August 27 – James B. Eustis, U.S.  Senator from Louisiana from 1876 to 1879 and from 1885 to 1891 (died 1899)
 September 5 – John G. Carlisle, U.S. Senator from Kentucky from 1890 to 1893 (died 1910)
 September 6 – Samuel Arnold, conspirator involved in the plot to kidnap U.S. President Abraham Lincoln in 1865 (died 1906)
 October 6 – Walter Kittredge, composer (died 1905)
 October 9 – Rufus Blodgett, U.S. Senator from New Jersey from 1887 to 1893 (died 1910)
 October 31 – Knowles Shaw, evangelist and hymnwriter (died 1878 in railroad accident)
 November 21 – Hetty Green, businesswoman (died 1916)
 November 24 – Susan Hammond Barney, American social activist and evangelist (died 1922)
 December 6 – Henry W. Blair, U.S. Senator from New Hampshire from 1879 to 1891 (died 1920)
 December 15 – Charles Augustus Young, astronomer (died 1908)
 December 24 – Charles W. Jones, Ireland-born U.S. Senator from Florida from 1875 to 1887 (died 1897)

Deaths
 February 2 – Lorenzo Dow, minister (born 1777)
 February 18 – William Wirt, 9th United States Attorney General (born 1772)
 February 28 – Isaac D. Barnard, U.S. Senator from 1827 to 1831 (born 1791)
 May 20 – Marquis de Lafayette, French aristocrat and military officer who fought in the American Revolutionary War, died in France (born 1757 in France)
 July 26 - Jonathan Jennings, first governor of Indiana (born 1784)
 August 24 – William Kelly, U.S. Senator from Alabama from 1822 to 1825 (born 1786)
 September 15 – William H. Crawford, politician and judge (born 1772)
 October 10 – Thomas Say, naturalist (born 1787)
 October 31 Éleuthère Irénée du Pont, chemical manufacturer (born 1771 in France)

See also
Timeline of United States history (1820–1859)

References

External links
 

 
1830s in the United States
United States
United States
Years of the 19th century in the United States